Roady is a 'Les Mousquetaires' shop brand, specialising in car supplies. They were opened in Portugal under the name Stationmarché in 28 places.

General info
These are garages and car supplies stores, normally form part of a shopping centre (such as Les Marchés des Mousquetaires). There are more than 100 branches in France, offering around 3,500 products. They are broken down into two areas of 350m² each, half is a workshop, half is the sales area.

In 2009, The Stationmarché brand in France was incorporated into Roady.
In Portugal, Stationmarché was renamed Roady in 2009, too.

References

External links
Les Mousquetaires site
Roady Site (French, no English version)

French brands
Retail companies established in 1986
1986 establishments in France